"Heard It All Before" is the debut single by American recording artist Sunshine Anderson, from her debut studio album, Your Woman (2001). It was written by Anderson, Rayshawn Sherrer, Chris Dawley, and Mike City and produced by the latter. Released as the album's lead single on February 27, 2001, it reached the top ten on both the UK Singles Chart and the US Billboard Hot R&B/Hip-Hop Singles & Tracks chart while peaking at the number 18 on the Billboard Hot 100.

Soulife remix
In 2006, a remix version of "Heard It All Before" featuring fellow R&B singer Brandy was leaked onto the internet. The duet was recorded during a session when producer Mike City was working with both singers in 2001 but remained unused. In March 2016, City released a high quality version of the duet to his SoundCloud account.

Track listing

Credits and personnel
Credits adapted from the liner notes of Your Woman.
 Engineering – Jesse "Biz" Stewart, Ryan Wirthlin
 Mastering – Brian Gardner
 Mixing – Larry Furgerrson, Manny Marroquin
 Mixing assistance – Andy Gunn, Ian Blanch 
 Production – Mike City

Charts

Weekly charts

Year-end charts

Certifications

Release history

References

External links
 

2001 debut singles
2001 songs
Atlantic Records singles
Songs about infidelity
Songs written by Mike City